Angel Serra (born 2 October 1951) is a Cuban rower. He competed in the men's coxless four event at the 1972 Summer Olympics.

References

1951 births
Living people
Cuban male rowers
Olympic rowers of Cuba
Rowers at the 1972 Summer Olympics
Place of birth missing (living people)